The 2011 FIA WTCC Race of Hungary was the fourth round of the 2011 World Touring Car Championship season and the inaugural running of the FIA WTCC Race of Hungary. It was held on 5 June 2011 at the Hungaroring in Mogyoród near Budapest, Hungary.

Both races were won by Chevrolet RML with Alain Menu winning race one and defending champion Yvan Muller taking his first win of the season in race one. Javier Villa took his first World Touring Car Championship podium finish in race one.

Background
Coming into the round, Robert Huff was leading the drivers' championship 36 points clear of Chevrolet team–mate Muller. Kristian Poulsen was leading the Yokohama Independents' Trophy.

The Race of Hungary was a late addition to the championship calendar, following the cancellation of the FIA WTCC Race of Morocco the Hungaroring was selected as the replacement venue on the same date.

SUNRED Engineering chose to debut their new 1.6 litre turbo engine event in some of their cars. Reliability concerns meant the front running cars of Gabriele Tarquini and Tiago Monteiro would not run the engine while Fredy Barth, Michel Nykjær and Pepe Oriola ran the new engine. DeTeam KK Motorsport driver Marchy Lee missed the Hungarian round pending a new sponsorship arrangement.

Report

Testing and free practice
Menu led the opening test session on Friday ahead of Huff and Muller. The Volvo C30 of Robert Dahlgren was fourth quickest ahead of local driver Norbert Michelisz in the BMW 320 TC. Monteiro was the fastest SEAT driver in tenth and Oriola was fastest of the SUNRED León driver in fourteenth.

Huff was fastest in free practice one on Saturday morning, leading another Chevrolet 1–2–3. Michelisz was the lead BMW in fourth and Monteiro was once again the fastest SEAT car in seventh. The only notable problem during the session was when Urs Sonderegger spun his Wiechers-Sport BMW at the final corner and brought out the yellow flags before continuing.

Chevrolet topped the final practice session, this time with Muller edging out the Polestar Racing Volvo of Dahlgren. Sonderegger brought the session to a half with twelve minutes remaining when he crashed into the tyre wall at the first corner, the session resumed once the tyre wall had been repaired.

Qualifying
Menu took his first pole position since the 2009 FIA WTCC Race of UK, also ending the pole streak of his team–mate Huff. In the first part of qualifying, Mehdi Bennani finished tenth to claim pole position for race two. Championship leader Huff didn't make it through to the second session and would line up twelfth for the races.

In the second session, Menu set his best time early on and Muller moved up to second in the final moments to lock out the front row for Chevrolet. Muller displaced Proteam Racing driver Villa to third and Tom Coronel was fourth. Local driver Michelisz was fifth and Dahlgren was sixth. Monteiro was the highest placed SEAT driver in seventh while Poulsen, Tarquini and Bennani rounded out the top ten.

Warm-Up
Dahlgren topped the warm–up session on Sunday morning as pole sitter Menu went sixth fastest. After sustaining minor injuries in practice, Sonderegger and Wiechers–Sport would not participate in the rest of the weekend.

Race One
Menu kept his lead at the start while a number of cars including Muller and Coronel ran wide at the first corner. This allowed Michelisz to climb up to second place and catch up with Menu, by lap four the pair were bumper to bumper. Tarquini recovered from his ninth place grid spot to run third at the end of the first lap having briefly battled for second with Michelisz. Dahlgren ran wide and slid through one of the gravel traps but was able to return to the pits. Darryl O'Young served a drive through on lap eight for cutting turn four. After defending for eleven laps, Tarquini and Villa made contact at the first corner and ran wide. Villa took third place and Tarquini dropped to fourth, while the Chevrolets of Muller and Huff stayed behind. Menu held on to take the win with Michelisz second and Villa in third took his first podium in the championship. Barth finished eighth and took the first points for the SUNRED turbo engine and Coronel had retired in the later stages of the race due to high water temperature.

Race Two
Bennani started on pole position but was passed by Poulsen, who was then struck by Michelisz who had outbraked himself while trying to take third place. Also on the opening lap, Muller was on his way up the order from eight on the grid. He was fourth by the time the race was red flagged due to a heavy rainstorm. All of the cars had been on slick tyres so stopping the race was the only option. The race was resumed on a damp track with the cars now sporting wet tyres. Menu dipped one of his wheels onto the grass at turn four and crashed into the barrier as Muller climbed up to second after passing Coronel. Dahlgren pushed Oriola into one of the barriers and the SEAT retired while Dahlgren would later receive a driver–through penalty for his actions. On the second lap after the restart, Muller then passed Tarquini to take the lead. Huff had climbed from twelfth at the start to eventually take second from Tarquini. At the end of the race, Muller and Huff formed a Chevrolet 1–2, Muller claiming his first win of the season. Tarquini was third ahead of Coronel and Monteiro. Franz Engstler in sixth was the winning independent driver.

Results

Qualifying

Bold denotes Pole position for second race.

Race 1

Bold denotes Fastest lap.

Race 2

Bold denotes Fastest lap.

Standings after the event

Drivers' Championship standings

Yokohama Independents' Trophy standings

Manufacturers' Championship standings

 Note: Only the top five positions are included for both sets of drivers' standings.

References

External links
World Touring Car Championship official website

Hungary
FIA WTCC Race of Hungary
FIA WTCC Race of Hungary